Retta (Reta) is a Papuan language spoken on the south sides of Pura and Ternate islands, between Pantar and Alor in the Alor archipelago of Indonesia. It is not mutually intelligible with Blagar, which is spoken on the north side of Pura Island, and is unrelated to Alorese, which is spoken on the north side of Ternate.

References

Alor–Pantar languages
Languages of Indonesia